Carlos Vásquez (born 12 March 1962) is a Uruguayan footballer. He played in three matches for the Uruguay national football team from 1983 to 1984. He was also part of Uruguay's squad for the 1983 Copa América tournament.

References

1962 births
Living people
Uruguayan footballers
Uruguay international footballers
Place of birth missing (living people)
Association football defenders